Belgium has competed at the World Athletics Relays since first edition held in 2014, Belgiumns athletes have won a total of 2 bronze medals.

Medals

See also
 Belgian men's 4 × 400 metres relay team
 Royal Belgian Athletics League

References

External links
 World Athletics Relays at World Athletics
 Royal Belgian Athletics League

 
Nations at the World Athletics Relays